The Netherlands participated in the Eurovision Song Contest 2005 with the song "My Impossible Dream" written by Robert D. Fisher and Bruce Smith. The song was performed by Glennis Grace. The Dutch broadcaster Nederlandse Omroep Stichting (NOS) organised the national final Nationaal Songfestival 2005 in collaboration with broadcaster Televisie Radio Omroep Stichting (TROS) in order to select the Dutch entry for the 2005 contest in Kyiv, Ukraine. 24 entries competed in the national final which consisted of five shows: four semi-finals and a final. Six entries competed in each semi-final with three advancing: two entries selected based on a public vote and one entry selected by a three-member jury panel. Twelve entries qualified from to compete in the final on 13 February 2005 where "My Impossible Dream" performed by Glennis Grace was selected as the winner following the combination of votes from three jury panels and a public vote. 

The Netherlands competed in the semi-final of the Eurovision Song Contest which took place on 19 May 2005. Performing during the show in position 9, "My Impossible Dream" was not announced among top 10 entries of the semi-final and therefore did not qualify to compete in the final. It was later revealed that the Netherlands placed fourteenth out of the 25 participating countries in the semi-final with 35 points.

Background 

The Dutch least successful result has been last place, which they have achieved on four occasions, most recently in the 1968 contest.

The Dutch national broadcaster, Nederlandse Omroep Stichting (NOS), broadcast the event within the Netherlands and organises the selection process for the nation's entry. The Netherlands has used various methods to select the Dutch entry in the past, such as the Nationaal Songfestival, a live televised national final to choose the performer, song or both to compete at Eurovision. However, internal selections have also been held on occasion. Since 2003, NOS, in collaboration with broadcaster Televisie Radio Omroep Stichting (TROS), has organised Nationaal Songfestival in order to select the Dutch entry for the contest, a method that was continued for the 2005 Dutch entry.

Before Eurovision

Nationaal Songfestival 2005 
Nationaal Songfestival 2005 was the national final developed by NOS/TROS that selected the Dutch entry for the Eurovision Song Contest 2005. Twenty-four entries competed in the competition consisting of five shows that commenced with the first of four semi-finals on 20 January 2005 and concluded with a final on 13 February 2005. All shows in the competition took place at the Pepsi Stage in Amsterdam, hosted by Nance Coolen and Hans Schiffers and were broadcast on Nederland 2 as well as streamed online via the broadcaster's Eurovision Song Contest website songfestival.nl.

Format 
The format of the national final consisted of five shows: four semi-finals and a final. The semi-finals each featured six competing entries from which three advanced from each show to complete the twelve-song lineup in the final. The results for the semi-final shows were determined by a three-member expert jury and votes from the public. The songs first faced a public televote where the top two entries qualified, while the jury selected an additional qualifier from the remaining entries. In the final, the winner was selected by the combination of votes from public televoting and three juries. Viewers were able to vote via telephone and SMS.

The expert jury panel that voted in all shows consisted of:

 Cornald Maas – journalist
 Esther Hart – vocal teacher and 2003 Dutch Eurovision entrant
 Paul de Leeuw – singer and television personality

Competing entries 
A submission period was opened by the Dutch broadcaster on 2 August 2004 where artists and composers were able to submit their entries until 1 October 2004. 250 submissions were received by the broadcaster at the closing of the deadline, and the twenty-four selected competing entries were announced during a press conference on 17 December 2004. Among the artists were Laura Vlasblom (as part of Airforce) who previously represented the Netherlands at the Eurovision Song Contest 1986 as part of Frizzle Sizzle, and Justine Pelmelay who previously represented the Netherlands at the Eurovision Song Contest 1989. Trinity and No Angels changed their names to Trinity United and We're No Angels before the competition.

Shows

Semi-finals
The four semi-finals took place on 20 January, 27 January, 3 February and 10 February 2005. In each semi-final six acts competed and four entries qualified to the final. A public televote first selected the top two entries to advance, while an additional qualifier was selected by a three-member expert jury from the remaining four entries.

Final
The final took place on 13 February 2005 where the twelve entries that qualified from the preceding four semi-finals competed. The winner, "My Impossible Dream" performed by Glennis Grace, was selected by the 50/50 combination of a public televote and the votes of three juries: a three-member expert jury, a ten-member radio jury consisting of listeners of Radio 2 and a ten-member international jury consisting of foreign conservatory students. The viewers and the juries each had a total of 290 points to award. Each member of the expert jury and the remaining two jury groups distributed their points as follows: 1, 2, 3, 4, 6, 7, 8, 10 and 12 points. The viewer vote was based on the percentage of votes each song achieved through the following voting methods: telephone and SMS voting. For example, if a song gained 10% of the vote, then that entry would be awarded 10% of 290 points rounded to the nearest integer: 29 points.

In addition to the performances of the competing entries, the show featured guest performances by Jim Bakkum, Irish 1980 and 1987 Eurovision winner Johnny Logan and past Dutch Eurovision entrants Mandy Huydts (1986), Maxine and Franklin Brown (1996), Marlayne (1999) and Esther Hart (2003).

Ratings

At Eurovision
According to Eurovision rules, all nations with the exceptions of the host country, the "Big Four" (France, Germany, Spain and the United Kingdom) and the ten highest placed finishers in the 2004 contest are required to qualify from the semi-final on 19 May 2005 in order to compete for the final on 21 May 2005; the top ten countries from the semi-final progress to the final. On 22 March 2005, a special allocation draw was held which determined the running order for the semi-final and the Netherlands was set to perform in position 10, following the entry from Belarus and before the entry from Iceland. At the end of the semi-final, the Netherlands was not announced among the top 10 entries in the semi-final and therefore failed to qualify to compete in the final. It was later revealed that Iceland placed sixteenth in the semi-final, receiving a total of 52 points.

The semi-final and the final was broadcast in the Netherlands on Nederland 2 with commentary by Willem van Beusekom and Cornald Maas as well as via radio on Radio 3FM with commentary by Hijlco Span and Ron Stoeltie. The Dutch spokesperson, who announced the Dutch votes during the final, was Nance Coolen.

Voting 
Below is a breakdown of points awarded to the Netherlands and awarded by the Netherlands in the semi-final and grand final of the contest. The nation awarded its 12 points to Denmark in the semi-final and to Turkey in the final of the contest.

Points awarded to the Netherlands

Points awarded by the Netherlands

References

2005
Countries in the Eurovision Song Contest 2005
Eurovision